Terje Lyshaug is a Norwegian curler.

Teams

References

External links

Living people
Norwegian male curlers
Year of birth missing (living people)
Place of birth missing (living people)